Jeong Ga-eun (born Baek Ra-hee on May 21, 1978) is a South Korean actress and clothing retailer who has appeared in several Korean television series such as Rollercoaster and Sunday Sunday Night.

Career
Debuting as a beauty contestant for Miss Gyeongnam Seon of 2001, Jeong began a career in the entertainment industry by serving as the fitting model and face of CJ O Shopping's clothing merchandise.

Soon after, Jeong rose to fame as a TV personality, joining variety show casts such as Sponge 2.0, BEAST Idol Maid, Infinite Girls and Heroes. She concurrently made several Korean soap operas and commercials including LG's TNGT in 2006 and SK Telecom in 2007. In July 2009, she joined a situation comedy programme called Rollercoaster of South Korean cable channel tvN, and it boosted her popularity.

Since creating it in 2009, Jeong co-operates an online dress mall called Jungganda (정간다; Korean, "Jeong is coming").

Personal life
Jeong married a businessman on January 30, 2016, in Gangnam, Seoul. She gave birth to a daughter on July 20. On January 26, 2018, her agency announced their divorce.

Appearances
 Films 
 Tales of Nobody (2023) 

Television
 KBS2 Sponge 2.0 (2003–2012)
 MBC Sunday Sunday Night (2009–2014)
 tvN Rollercoaster, lead actress with Jeong Hyeong-don 
 MBC Infinite Girls Season 1
 SBS Good Sunday's Yo Girls Diary Season 2 (2010)
 SBS Heroes (2010–2011)
 MBC BEAST Idol Maid (2010)
 SBS Master's Sun as Ahn Jin-joo
 MBC A Thousand Kisses as Jang Hye-bin (2011–2012)
 tvN Rollercoaster 2
 KBS2 Family (2012 TV series) (2012) cameo
 SBS Plus Her Lovely Heels (2014)
 SBS FiL Do you light up your daily daily life (2021) 
 Shall I Light Your Daily Life (Host, 2022) 
Music Video
 Shinhwa's "Throw my fist"

References

External links

 Cyworld 
 
 

1978 births
Living people
Miss Korea delegates
South Korean television actresses
People from Busan
South Korean female models
21st-century South Korean actresses